Hardenberg (or  'n Arnbarg) is a city and municipality in the province of Overijssel, Eastern Netherlands. The municipality of Hardenberg has a population of about 60,000, with about 19,000 living in the city. It received city rights in 1362 from Jan van Arkel, Bishop of Utrecht. The famous Pieterpad passes through Hardenberg, a municipality which is located on the German border. A sizable portion of the population speaks Dutch Low Saxon as a native language.

Transport

Cycling

There are many cycling routes throughout Hardenberg. The Great Hardenburg Bicycle Race takes place each August, with the top 3 victors being named the "Wheeler-Kings" of the town and given lifetime passes to the local museum.

Road
The N34, which runs through Hardenberg, is its major road.

Trains
Railway stations: 
Gramsbergen station
Hardenberg station
Mariënberg station

Leisure
De Boshoek is a sport park off the N34 in the outskirts of Hardenberg, near Ommen.

HHC Hardenberg is the local football club of Hardenberg.

De slag is the indoor-swimming pool of Hardenberg located in the outskirts of Hardenberg (across the hospital).

Towns and villages

In the town 
Baalder
Baalderveld
Centrum
Hazenbos
Heemse
Heemserbos
Heemsermars
Marslanden
Norden

In the municipality

Notable people 

 Albert Hardenberg (c.1510 in Rheeze – 1574) a Reformed theologian and Protestant reformer
 Henk Dorgelo (1894 in Dedemsvaart – 1961) a Dutch physicist and academic
 Anna Charlotte Ruys (1898 in Dedemsvaart – 1977) a Dutch professor of bacteriology and epidemiology
 Mien Ruys (1904 in Dedemsvaart – 1999) a Dutch landscape and garden architect
 August Aimé Balkema (1906 in Avereest – 1996) a Dutch book trader and publisher active in Amsterdam and South Africa
 Henk Bodewitz (born 1939 in Gramsbergen) is a Dutch Sanskrit scholar
 Martin Koster (born 1950 in Dedemsvaart) a Dutch writer in the Drèents variety of Dutch Low Saxon
 Joke Bouwstra (born 1956 in Hardenberg) a Dutch researcher and professor of drug administration at Leiden University
 Roel Kuiper (born 1962 in Mariënberg) a Dutch historian, philosopher, ideologue, politician and university professor
 Roos-Anne (Sanne) Hans (born 1984 in Dedemsvaart) known as lead singer of the band Miss Montreal is a Dutch singer-songwriter and guitar player

Sport 
 Erik Hartsuiker (born 1940 in Avereest) a retired Dutch rower, bronze medallist at the 1964 Summer Olympics
 Helen Tanger (born 1978 in Hardenberg) is a rower and bronze medallist at the 2004 Summer Olympics
 Arne Slot (born 1978 in Bergentheim) a former Dutch professional footballer midfielder with 450 caps
 Kyra Lamberink (born 1996 in Bergentheim) a Dutch female track cyclist
 Niek Kimmann (born 1996 in Lutten) a Dutch male BMX racing cyclist and gold medallist at the 2020 Summer Olympics
 Kas Haverkort (born 2003 in Hardenberg) a Dutch racing driver and Spanish F4 champion

Image gallery

References

External links 

Official website

 
Populated places in Overijssel
Municipalities of Overijssel
Salland